Shalamar Medical and Dental College (abbreviated as SMDC, SHMC or SHMDC), established in 2009 and named after Shalimar Gardens, Lahore, is a private college of medicine and dentistry located on Shalimar Link Road, Lahore in Shalimar Town.

Recognition
Recognized by the College of Physicians and Surgeons of Pakistan. 
It is accredited by the Pakistan Medical and Dental Council and registered with the Educational Commission for Foreign Medical Graduates. Shalamar Hospital and Fauji Foundation Hospital, Lahore are attached as training and teaching hospitals. Shalamar Medical and Dental College is a college within the larger institute, Shalamar Institute of Health Sciences.
 Affiliated with the University of Health Sciences, Lahore.

Academic programs
 MBBS

Student bodies
 Arts and Photography Club (Facebook)
 Blood Donating Society (Facebook)
 Cultural Society (Facebook)
 Dramatics Society (Facebook)
 Literary and Debating Society (Facebook)
 Music Society (Facebook)
 Sports Club (Facebook)

Publications
 AXON: The Unheard Impulses of Shalamarians - Annual Magazine

College convocations
In 2016, Shalamar Medical and Dental College held its 2nd convocation for its 99 graduating students who were awarded  degrees. The convocation's chief guest was former Justice (Retired) Khalil-ur-Rehman Ramday. Other noted personalities at the event were the 2 governors of the Shalamar Institute of Health Sciences, Chaudhry Ahmad Saeed and Syed Babar Ali.

In 2018, 97 graduating students were conferred with degrees and the chief guest was Pakistan's noted personality in the healthcare field Dr. Sania Nishtar.

See also
Shalamar Hospital
Shalamar Nursing College
Shalamar Institute of Health Sciences

References

External links
 

Medical colleges in Punjab, Pakistan
Dental schools in Pakistan
2009 establishments in Pakistan